The coat of arms of Wigan Metropolitan Borough Council was granted by the College of Arms in 1974.

Arms of Wigan Metropolitan Borough Council

The field of the arms consists of alternating gold and black lozenges or diamond shapes. Black lozenges are extensively used in British civic heraldry to symbolise coal mining, while each gold lozenge bears a red rose of Lancaster to represent the union of several Lancashire communities in the metropolitan borough. The chief or top section of the shield displays a couchant lion from the crest of the county borough.

On top of the helm is the crest which consists of a crowned castle and mountain ash tree. The castle and crown were in the county borough arms. The tree is included as a reference to the borough's name: the local name for the mountain ash being "Wiggin Tree".

The supporters are a gold crowned lion from the county borough arms, and a sparrowhawk from the arms of the Atherton family, and found in the devices of Atherton Urban District council and the Borough of Leigh.

The motto is Progress With Unity.

Blazon
The blazon, or technical description of the arms is:

Arms of the County Borough of Wigan
The authority of Wigan County Borough was granted arms in 1922. The design incorporated several elements from a number of ancient seals.

The arms consisted of a red shield bearing a silver triple-towered castle with a gold ancient crown over the central tower. The design was taken from the earliest surviving seal of the borough dating from the twelfth century, which showed a castellated gateway over which appeared a crowned head, believed to be that of Henry I.

The crest consisted of a gold couchant lion in front of the head and shoulders of a king in a red robe and gold crown. The depiction used on the letters patent granting the arms was modelled on a portrait of Edward III. The lion was taken from the royal arms of England. In a charter of 1350 Edward granted Wigan the right to use a seal known as the King's Recognaisance Seal on which were depicted the king's head and royal lion.

The supporters were also royal lions, each holding aloft a branch of mountain ash or "Wiggin Tree".

The motto was Ancient and Loyal. Wigan described itself as the "Ancient and Loyal Borough", an epithet originating in the 1663 charter of Charles II which described the town as an "ancient borough" and noted its "loyalty to us". The 1663 charter governed the town until its reform by the Municipal Corporations Act 1835.

Blazon
The arms were blazoned as follows:

Seal used before 1922

The design on a seal adopted in the seventeenth century was used in lieu of arms until 1922. The seal was oval in shape and bore a depiction of Wigan's Moot Hall. The building had been the earliest meeting place for the borough corporation, and featured a belfry and a market cross. The Latin inscription was Sigillum commune villæ et burgi de Wigan.

References

Further reading
W. H. Fox-Talbot, The Book of Public Arms, 2nd edition, London 1915
W. C. Scott-Giles, Civic Heraldry of England and Wales, 2nd edition, London, 1953
G. Briggs, Civic and Corporate Heraldry, London, 1971

External links
Arms of Metropolitan Borough of Wigan (www.civicheraldry.co.uk)
Arms of County Borough of Wigan (www.civicheraldry.co.uk)

Wigan
Metropolitan Borough of Wigan
History of Wigan
 
Wigan
Wigan
Wigan
Wigan
Wigan
Wigan
Wigan